Mary Shelley (1797–1851) was an English novelist.

Mary Shelley may also refer to:
 Mary Shelley (film), a 2017 romantic period-drama film
 Mary Shelley (Doctor Who), a fictional version of the English writer
 Mary Michael Shelley (born 1950), American folk artist